Dinamo-Yuni Stadium is a football stadium in Minsk, Belarus. It is currently used for football matches and is the home stadium of FC Dinamo Minsk. The stadium holds 4,500 people and was opened in 2000.

Until 2008, the stadium was named Darida Stadium and was a home ground for FC Darida Minsk Raion. After the team's dissolution in late 2008, the stadium was bought by Dinamo Minsk and renamed to its current name, Dinamo-Yuni Stadium.

In early 2013, the stadium was closed for the renovation. It was reopened on 3 September 2021.

Sectors

External links
 Stadium info at Dinamo Minsk website

References

Football venues in Belarus
FC Dinamo Minsk
Sport in Minsk
Buildings and structures in Minsk